Raymond S. "Ray" Burton (August 13, 1939 – November 12, 2013) was a New Hampshire politician who served from 1977–79 and 1981–2013 on the Executive Council as the representative of District 1, or "The North Country". Known as the "Dean of the Council", Burton, a Republican, was the longest-serving Executive Councilor in New Hampshire history.  Burton also served for 22 years as a Grafton County Commissioner, representing District 2.

Burton lived in the town of Bath, New Hampshire, where he died on November 12, 2013.

References

External links
 Grafton County Commissioner Ray Burton (District 2) official government site
 List of Former Members of the Executive Council of the State of New Hampshire official government site

1939 births
2013 deaths
People from Bath, New Hampshire
Politicians from Burlington, Vermont
New Hampshire Republicans
Members of the Executive Council of New Hampshire
County commissioners in New Hampshire